Ustad Imdad Khan (1848 – 1920) was a sitar and surbahar player. He was the first sitar player ever to be recorded.

Family background
The Imdad Khan family is of Hindu Rajput lineage before the family converted to Islam.
Imdad Khan is considered one of the founders of Etawah gharana (Imdadkhani gharana) of Hindustani classical music.

His two sons Enayat Khan and Wahid Khan, his grandsons Vilayat Khan and Imrat Khan, and great-grandsons Shahid Parvez, Shujaat Khan, Nishat Khan, Irshad Khan, Wajahat Khan, Shafaatullah Khan, Azmat Ali Khan and Hidayat Khan have all upheld his musical tradition, musical luminaries themselves.

Zila Khan the Sufi, classical and semi classical singer is the first female artist from this gharana, she is Vilayat Khan's daughter whom her father formally made a student also.

Imdad Khan taught the sitar and surbahar to his two sons, Enayat and Wahid Khan, whom he used to refer to as his two hands. Although both of them played the sitar and the surbahar, Enayat Khan specialized on the sitar and Wahid Khan on the surbahar.

Early life and career
Imdad Khan was born in Agra, as the fourth generation of what was to become the Imdadkhani Gharana (school) or Etawah gharana, named after a village outside Agra where the family soon moved. He was taught by his father, Sahabdad Khan, a trained vocalist and self-taught sitar player, but Imdad came to greatly develop and define the family style and techniques. Imdad Khan was also trained by the legendary beenkar Bande Ali Khan (disciple and son-in-law of Haddu Khan). In the 19th Century, the instrumental classical music of North India was dominated by the Senia style, passed down through the musical  dynasty of Miyan Tansen's descendants, who played in the dhrupad ang. Imdad instead evolved a style based on the newer, more popular khyal singing. It is said that in his youth at Etawah, Imdad practiced on the sitar in a state of chilla (isolation) for some twelve years. When he moved with his family to Kolkata, the house in which they lived was named "Riyaz" (practice).

Rajput lineage
The Imdad Khan family is of Hindu Rajput lineage. The family is of Hindu origin and later converted to Islam. In an informal continuation of his rajput lineage Ustad Enayat Khan (father of Ustad Vilayat Khan) kept a Hindu name of Nath Singh. Ustad Vilayat Khan himself composed many bandishes using the pen name Nath Piya.

Tribute
Imdad attained great fame in his lifetime: he served as a court musician in Mysore and Indore, and he was the first sitar player ever to be recorded. Some of these recordings have been released on CD, on the Great Gharanas: Imdadkhani compilation in RPG/EMI's Chairman's Choice series.

References

Footnotes 
 "Hamare Sangit Ratna", a treatise on great Ustads of India

1848 births
1920 deaths
Etawah gharana
Hindustani instrumentalists
People from Etawah
Sitar players
20th-century Indian musicians